Cotta was an ancient town built by Romans in the 1st century AD, in the province of Mauretania Tingitana, to function primarily as a garum factory. The town was likely abandoned in the 3rd century AD. Its ancient ruins are now located on the Atlantic coast of modern-day Morocco a few kilometers south of Cap Spartel, and include the garum factory, an olive press, a temple, a villa and a bath complex.

History 
The factory at Cotta was established in Mauretania Tingitana after the annexation of the Kingdom of Mauretania in 40 AD. It is one of several other factories established on both sides of the Mediterranean (North Africa and Iberia), and was intended to be a self-sufficient complex, given the presence of farming land nearby.

Excavation 
The site was excavated by archaeologists Michel Ponsich and Miquel Tarradell in 1965. It is the most thoroughly excavated site of its kind in ancient Tingitana. Its structure is no different from other sites found for example at Lixus and Baelo Claudia.

References

External Links 

 Photos of Cotta كوطا from the Manar al-Athar Digital Photo Archive

History of Morocco
Archaeological sites in Morocco
Roman towns and cities in Mauretania Tingitana
Mauretania Tingitana